Sweet Warrior  is the thirteenth studio album by Richard Thompson, released in 2007. Thompson financed the recording of this album himself and then licensed the finished album to various labels for distribution. On its release, Sweet Warrior entered Amazon.com's top 20 for music sales.

Overview

The track "Dad's Gonna Kill Me" was given an advance release via Thompson's own web site and iTunes. The song was singled out for praise by critics

and featured prominently in Thompson's live performances in early 2007.
This song's lyrics make extensive use of U.S. military slang (the "Dad" of the title is GI slang for "Baghdad"), and convey the thoughts and feelings of an uneasy U.S. soldier fighting in Iraq. It was subsequently used on the closing montage of the first episode of the third season of Sons of Anarchy.

This advance release also enjoyed airplay on several radio stations and attracted generally favourable comments from the press and advance publicity for the album.

The album received very favourable reviews.

Track listing

All songs written by Richard Thompson:

 "Needle and Thread" - 4:43
 "I'll Never Give It Up " - 3:22
 "Take Care the Road You Choose" - 6:44
 "Mr. Stupid" - 3:53
 "Dad's Gonna Kill Me" - 5:16
 "Poppy-Red" - 4:37
 "Bad Monkey" - 5:13
 "Francesca" - 5:17
 "Too Late to Come Fishing" - 4:36
 "Sneaky Boy" - 2:59
 "She Sang Angels to Rest" - 3:25
 "Johnny's Far Away" - 4:53
 "Guns Are the Tongues" - 7:27
 "Sunset Song" - 5:38

Bonus tracks on the P-Vine Records release for the Japanese market:

 "Any Old Body"
 "Dust and Wine"

Personnel

 Musical

 Richard Thompson - vocals, electric guitar, steel-string acoustic guitar, mandolin, accordion, tin whistle, autoharp, harmonium, hurdy-gurdy, electronic organ, handclaps (on 10)
 Michael Hays - rhythm guitar, electric guitar, acoustic guitar, backing vocals
 Danny Thompson - double bass
 Taras Prodaniuk - electric bass guitar
 Michael Jerome - drums, percussion
 Judith Owen - backing vocals, handclaps (on 10)
 Sara Watkins - fiddle (on 5, 12–13)
 Joe Sublett - tenor saxophone (on 7–8)
 Joe Buck - first violin (on 11)
 Al Michaels - second violin (on 11)
 Novi Ola - viola (on 11)
 Simon Tassano - handclaps (on 10)
 Chris Kasych - handclaps (on 10)

 Technical

 Doug Tyo - engineer (at House of Blues Studio, Encino, California)
 Chris Kasych - assistant engineer
 Simon Tassano - mixing (at Rumiville Studio, Austin, Texas)
 Jim Wilson - mastering (at Airshow Mastering, Boulder, Colorado)

References

 Sources consulted
 Official credits page

 Endnotes

External links
 Official lyrics page

2007 albums
Richard Thompson (musician) albums
P-Vine Records albums
Proper Records albums